The Toronto Stock Exchange (TSX) is a stock exchange located in Toronto, Ontario, Canada. It is the 10th largest exchange in the world and the third largest in North America based on market capitalization. Based in the EY Tower in Toronto's Financial District, the TSX is a wholly owned subsidiary of the TMX Group for the trading of senior equities.

History

Beginnings

The Toronto Stock Exchange likely descended from the Association of Brokers, a group formed by Toronto businessmen on July 26, 1852. No records of the group's transactions have survived. It is however known that on October 25, 1861, twenty-four brokers gathered at the Masonic Hall to create and participate in the Toronto Stock Exchange. Between 1852 and 1870, two other distinct, commodity-orientated, exchanges were founded : the Toronto Exchange in 1854 and the Toronto Stock and Mining Exchange in 1868. Initially the TSE had 13 listings but it grew to 18 in 1868 (a majority of bonds and bank's issues). Many banks of Upper Canada failed during 1869, which halted any sort of trading in the city as the market was just too small. A bull market in 1870 boosted investor's confidence and eight of the original 24 brokers joined again to re-establish the TSE. The exchange was incorporated by an act of the Legislative Assembly of Ontario in 1878.

The TSE grew continuously in size and in shares traded, save for a three-month period in 1914 when the exchange was shut down for fear of financial panic due to World War I. The day of the Wall Street Crash of 1929, Toronto's exchange was better connected to New York's and received the bad news before Montreal's (prior to 1931, exchanges communicated via telephone or by brokers’ private wires, as they were not yet interconnected by ticker). By the afternoon, its three most popular stocks were down by at least 8%: International Nickel, Hiram Walker & Sons and Brazilian Light & Power. The following day, a record number of 331,000 shares changed hands on the TSE, with an overall loss of value of 20% (in Montreal, 525,000 shares and 25% loss).

Meanwhile, a British Columbia gold rush in the 1890s stimulated the demand for start-up capital but Montreal and Toronto's exchanges deemed the ventures too risky. The boom was handled with the Toronto Stock and Mining Exchange, founded in 1896 and which merged with its rival Standard Stock and Mining Exchange in 1899. The SSME, after years of ups and downs, was amalgamated into the Toronto Stock Exchange in 1934. While a durable surge in mining trading was recorded in Toronto (either commodities or securities), in Montreal the volume of the equity-centric market was going down. Toronto found itself a reputation as a financial centre for mining and from 1934, the total trading volume on the TSE surpassed that of Montreal's.

A major exchange

The TSE moved on Bay Street in 1913 and in 1937 opened a new trading floor and headquarters in an Art Deco building, still on Bay. By 1936, the Toronto Stock Exchange grew to become the third largest in North America.

In 1977, it launched the TSE 300 index and introduced the CATS (Computer Assisted Trading System), an automated trading system, and began to use it for the quotation of less liquid equities. In 1983, the TSE vacated its Art Deco headquarters on Bay Street and moved into the Exchange Tower. The old TSE building later became the Design Exchange, a museum and education centre. On April 23, 1997, the TSE's trading floor closed, making it the second-largest stock exchange in North America to choose a floorless, electronic (or virtual trading) environment.

In 1999, through a major realignment plan, Toronto Stock Exchange became Canada's sole exchange for the trading of senior equities. The Bourse de Montréal/Montreal Exchange assumed responsibility for the trading of derivatives and the Vancouver Stock Exchange and Alberta Stock Exchange merged to form the Canadian Venture Exchange (CDNX) handling trading in junior equities. The Canadian Dealing Network, Winnipeg Stock Exchange, and equities portion of the Montreal Exchange later merged with CDNX. In 2000, the Toronto Stock Exchange became a for-profit company. In 2002 its acronym was rebranded to TSX and it became a public company.

TMX Group era
In 2001, the Toronto Stock Exchange acquired the Canadian Venture Exchange, which was renamed the TSX Venture Exchange in 2002; this resulted in the creation of a parent to the TSX, the TSX Group.  This ended 123 years of the usage of TSE as a Canadian stock exchange. On May 11, 2007, the S&P/TSX Composite, the main index of the Toronto Stock Exchange, traded above the 14,000 point level for the first time ever. On December 17, 2008, for the first time in TSX history, the exchange was closed for an entire trading day due to a technical glitch.

On February 9, 2011, the London Stock Exchange announced that it had agreed to merge with the TMX Group, Toronto Stock Exchange's parent, hoping to create a combined entity with a market capitalization of $5.9 trillion (£3.7 trillion). Xavier Rolet, who is CEO of the LSE Group, would have headed the new enlarged company, while TMX Chief Executive Thomas Kloet would become the new firm president. Based on data from December 30, 2010 the new stock exchange would have been the second largest in the world with a market cap 48% greater than the Nasdaq. Eight of the 15 board members of the combined entity were to be appointed by LSE, 7/15 by TMX. The provisional name for the combined group would be LTMX Group plc. About two weeks after Maple Group launched a competing bid the LSEG-TMX deal was terminated after failing to receive the minimum 67% voter approval from shareholders of TMX Group. The rejection came amidst new concerns raised by Bank of Canada governor Mark Carney regarding foreign control of clearing systems and opposition to the deal by Ontario's finance minister.

Operations
The exchange has a normal trading session from 09:30am to 04:00pm ET and a post-market session from 4:15pm to 5:00pm ET on all days of the week except Saturdays, Sundays and holidays declared by the Exchange in advance.

Companies listed

As of August 2019, Toronto Stock Exchange had 1,569 listed issuers (including ETFs and other structured financial products) with a combined market capitalization of CAD $3,059,755,023,680. By the end of 2019, the total market capitalization of companies listed on TSX & TSXV reached $3.2 trillion.

The exchange is home to all of Canada's Big Five commercial banks—Canadian Imperial Bank of Commerce (CIBC), Bank of Montreal (BMO), Bank of Nova Scotia (Scotiabank), Royal Bank of Canada (RBC), and the Toronto-Dominion Bank (TD)—making the exchange the centre for banking in the country. This was seen as being most evident during the proposed mergers of Royal Bank with Bank of Montreal, and CIBC with the Toronto-Dominion Bank in 1998. Then-Finance Minister Paul Martin blocked the mergers to preserve competition.

The exchange is the primary listing for a number of energy companies including; Enbridge, Suncor, TC Energy, Canadian Natural Resources, Imperial Oil, Pembina and Cenovus all within the S&P/TSX 60 index.

Many of the large companies listed on the TSX, especially those on the S&P/TSX 60 index, have a secondary listing on an American exchange such as the New York Stock Exchange.

See also
Stock market index
System for Electronic Document Analysis and Retrieval (SEDAR)
List of stock exchanges
List of stock exchanges in the Americas
List of stock exchange mergers in the Americas
List of stock exchanges in the Commonwealth of Nations
S&P/TSX 60
:Category:Lists of companies listed on the Toronto Stock Exchange

References

External links

Official site
Site of parent company

 
Financial services companies established in 1861
1861 establishments in Ontario
Stock exchanges in Canada
Economy of Toronto
Companies based in Toronto
Canadian companies established in 1861